Scott Township is a township in Bourbon County, Kansas, USA.  As of the 2000 census, its population was 2,326.

Geography
Scott Township covers an area of  surrounding the incorporated city of Fort Scott.  According to the USGS, it contains seven cemeteries: Clarksburg, Evergreen, Lath Branch, Mayberry, Oak Grove, Saint Marys and Union Center.

The streams of Hickory Creek, Lath Branch, Rock Creek and Wolverine Creek run through this township.

Further reading

References

 USGS Geographic Names Information System (GNIS)

External links
 City-Data.com
 Bourbon County Maps: Current, Historic Collection

Townships in Bourbon County, Kansas
Townships in Kansas